Nekaneet Cree Nation ( kâ-nîkânît) is a Cree First Nations band government in southern Saskatchewan, Canada.

Reserves
 Nekaneet Cree Nation
 Treaty Four Reserve Grounds 77

References

First Nations in Saskatchewan
Division No. 4, Saskatchewan